Winterborne St Martin, commonly known as Martinstown, is a village and civil parish in southwest Dorset, England, situated  southwest of Dorchester, beside Maiden Castle. In 2013 the estimated population of the civil parish was 780.

In the centre of the village is the parish church of St Martin, which dates from the 12th century and has a Norman font. Other amenities in the village include a public house, village hall and post office. Bronze Age barrows including Clandon Barrow surround the village, and Maiden Castle hillfort is nearby. The stream running through the village is a winterbourne though rarely dries out in the summer now.

Winterborne St Martin is in the UK Weather Records for the Highest 24-hour total rainfall, which was recorded in the village on 18 July 1955. The total recorded was 279 mm (11 inches) in a 15-hour period. However this record was surpassed by Seathwaite in Cumbria in 2009.

History
In 1086 in the Domesday Book Winterborne St Martin was recorded as Wintreburne; it had 22 households, 6 ploughlands,  of meadow and one mill. It was in the hundred of Dorchester and the lord and tenant-in-chief was Hawise, wife of Hugh son of Grip.

In 1268 Henry II granted a charter to Winterborne St Martin, which allowed the village to hold an annual fair within five days of St. Martin's Day. The fair, which in times past was a leading horse market and amusement fair, had been revived, but the old-time custom of roasting a ram was replaced once during an event in the 1960s with a 'badger roast'. The 80 lb badger was caught in a snare, and many villagers thought they were eating goose.

After a hundred years silence, bells in the church rang out in 1947. Five new bells were hung as a village memorial to those who died in the war. An earlier peal had been sold to defray debts.

In 2007 and 2014 Martinstown won the Best Kept Village in Dorset Award, in the Large Village Category.

The Catholic martyr John Adams was born in Winterborne St Martin in about 1543. The politician Sir Francis Ashley was the main landowner here in the early seventeenth century.

Governance
Winterborne St Martin is within an electoral ward that bears its name and extends from Winterbourne Abbas in a roughly south-easterly direction to the edge of Upwey. The total population of this ward was 2,095 in the 2011 census. The ward is one of 32 that comprise the West Dorset parliamentary constituency, which is currently represented in the UK national parliament by the Conservative Chris Loder.

See also
List of hundreds in Dorset

References

Notes

External links

Aerial map

Villages in Dorset